Zygmunt Kiszkurno (6 January 192124 August 2012) was a Polish sport shooter who competed in the men's trap event at the 1956 Summer Olympics in Melbourne, where he finished 15th in a field of 32 competitors. He was born in Brudzew, Turek County and completed high school in 1939 in Warsaw. He trained in Łódź to be a dentist and received a medical degree from the University of Warsaw in 1969. During this time he also served in the Polish Land Forces, eventually achieving the rank of Pułkownik.

Kiszkurno continued shooting competitively following his Olympic appearance and was the Polish national champion in trap shooting in 1957 and 1969. Additionally, he won a silver medal at the 1964 European Shooting Championships. His father Józef competed in the same event in the previous year's Olympic Games and placed 9th.

References

1921 births
2012 deaths
Polish male sport shooters
Shooters at the 1956 Summer Olympics
Olympic shooters of Poland
People from Turek County
Sportspeople from Greater Poland Voivodeship